The 1950 Davidson Wildcats football team was an American football team that represented Davidson College during the 1950 college football season as a member of the Southern Conference. In their first year under head coach Crowell Little, the Wildcats compiled an overall record of 3–6, with a mark of 1–5 in conference play, and finished in 15th place in the SoCon.

Schedule

References

Davidson
Davidson Wildcats football seasons
Davidson Wildcats football